Dag the Wise or Dagr spaki  was a mythological Swedish king of the  House of Ynglings (dated to the 4th century by 16th-century historiographer Johannes Magnus). He was the son of Dyggvi, the former king. According to legend, he could understand the speech of birds and had a sparrow that gathered news for him from many lands.  When the bird was killed on one of these trips, Dag invaded Reidgotaland (considering the date and location, apparently Gothiscandza), in order to avenge it. There he was ambushed by a thrall and killed.

The earliest two versions based on Ynglingatal, i.e. Historia Norwegiæ and Íslendingabók (see below) say that Dag was succeeded by his sons Alrekr and Eírikr who in their turn were succeeded by Dag's grandson Agne (in Historia Norwegiæ incorrectly called Hogne):

Historia Norwegiæ:

Íslendingabók only lists the line of succession: x Dyggvi. xi Dagr. xii Alrekr. xiii Agni. xiiii Yngvi''''.

However, in the Ynglinga saga, Snorri Sturluson gives Agne as Dag's son and successor, and the two brothers Alrekr and Eiríkr as his grandsons.

This is what Snorri tells of Dag:

Then Snorri quoted Ynglingatal (9th century):

The fact that Skjótansvað/Vápnavað appear both in Ynglinga saga and in Historia Norwegiæ's earlier summary of Ynglingatal but not in Snorri's later quotation from it, suggests that all of Ynglingatal'' was not presented by him.

Sources
Ynglingatal
Ynglinga saga (part of the Heimskringla)
Historia Norwegiae

Notes

2nd-century births
3rd-century deaths
Mythological kings of Sweden